Nave San Rocco (Naf or Nào in local dialect) is a comune (municipality) in Trentino in the northern Italian region Trentino-Alto Adige/Südtirol, located about 11 km north of Trento. As of 31 December 2004, it had a population of 1,279 and an area of 4.9 km².

Nave San Rocco borders the following municipalities: Mezzolombardo, San Michele all'Adige, Lavis and Zambana.

Demographic evolution

References

Cities and towns in Trentino-Alto Adige/Südtirol